Finland was represented by Ami Aspelund, with the song "Fantasiaa", at the 1983 Eurovision Song Contest, which took place on 23 April in Munich. "Fantasiaa" was chosen as the Finnish entry at the national final organised by broadcaster Yle and held on 28 January.

Before Eurovision

National final 
The final was held at the Yle studios in Helsinki, hosted by Maria Valkama. Ten songs took part, with the winner chosen by postcard voting.

At Eurovision 
On the night of the final Aspelund performed 9th in the running order, following Switzerland and preceding Greece. At the close of voting "Fantasiaa" had picked up 41 points, placing Finland joint 11th of the 20 entries, the country's highest finish since 1977. The Finnish jury awarded its 12 points to Yugoslavia.

Voting

References

External links
 Full national final on Yle Elävä Arkisto

1983
Countries in the Eurovision Song Contest 1983
Eurovision